Leukotriene E4 (LTE4) is a cysteinyl leukotriene involved in inflammation. It is known to be produced by several types of white blood cells, including eosinophils, mast cells, tissue macrophages, and basophils, and recently was also found to be produced by platelets adhering to neutrophils. It is formed from the sequential conversion of LTC4 to LTD4 and then to LTE4, which is the final and most stable cysteinyl leukotriene. Compared to the short half lives of LTC4 and LTD4, LTE4 is relatively stable and accumulates in breath condensation, in plasma, and in urine, making it the dominant cysteinyl leukotriene detected in biologic fluids. Therefore, measurements of LTE4, especially in the urine, are commonly monitored in clinical research studies.

Increased production and excretion of LTE4 has been linked to several respiratory diseases, and urinary LTE4 levels are increased during severe asthma attacks and are especially high in people with aspirin-exacerbated respiratory disease.

Studies have suggested that LTE4 works through its own distinct receptor, and although one has not yet been discovered, research is ongoing to isolate and characterize an LTE4-specific receptor.

References

Eicosanoids
Dicarboxylic acids